The Quest is a Canadian short drama film, directed by Stanley Jackson and released in 1958. The film dramatizes the discovery of insulin by Canadian medical researchers Frederick Banting and Charles Best, acted by a cast including Leo Ciceri as Banting, Dennis Stanway as Best and Norman Ettlinger as John Macleod.

The film was one of three co-winners, alongside The Tall Country and Money Minters, of the Canadian Film Award for Best Theatrical Short Film at the 11th Canadian Film Awards in 1959.

References

External links

1958 films
Best Theatrical Short Film Genie and Canadian Screen Award winners
National Film Board of Canada short films
1958 short films
1950s English-language films
Films directed by Stanley Jackson
Canadian drama short films
1950s Canadian films